James Raynor Whiting (April 30, 1803 – March 16, 1872) was an American lawyer and politician from New York.

Life
He was New York County District Attorney from 1838 to 1844. In 1842 as District Attorney, he prosecuted John C. Colt for the murder of Samuel Adams.

In November 1855, he was elected on the Democratic ticket a justice of the New York Supreme Court, and took office on January 1, 1856, but resigned the following year. In November 1857, Josiah Sutherland was elected to fill the vacancy.

In November 1856, Whiting ran on a Reform ticket for Mayor of New York City, but he and four other candidates were defeated by Fernando Wood.

Whiting also owned and developed real estate. For example, he once owned the Broadway Theatre, demolished it, and replaced it with a modern textile showroom.

He was buried at the Woodlawn Cemetery (Bronx).

Obituary

The death of ex-Judge James R. Whiting, which occurred at his residence at Spuyten Duyvil, on Saturday night, was an event not wholly unexpected. Advancing age and the almost untiring activity with which he devoted himself to his professional duties, in addition to the supervisory care of his large property interests in this city, had greatly impaired the robust vigor of his constitution. His illness was brief. He died of pneumonia after only a week's sickness. Physically debilitated though he was when the disease attacked him, and greatly prostrated by its rapid and acute progress, he retained the possession of his mental faculties to the last, and, "life's fitful lever" over, passed away with tranquil and hopeful resignation, lacking only a few weeks of being sixty-three years of age.

Few men have been more prominently before the public for the last thirty years than ex-Judge Whiting. The march of events connected with our municipal progress and politics and its varied measures of reform in this time, bringing to the front, as it naturally did, the younger and more daring, impulsive and sinewy element, have succeeded in keeping him in the background. The greater effort to keep him down only inspired in him greater energy of will. Regarded by many as of the Don Quixote school of enthusiasts, and fighting windmills, he yet fought with a lustiness of purpose and honesty of determination that elicited commendation of his heroic endeavors, though often fruitlessly expended in what plainly foreshadowed itself as a hopelessly lost cause. Fighting against odds was his element. No number of defeats daunted him. Pushed under at one point he rose to the surface elsewhere, as fiery, impetuous, determined as ever. These remarks apply more particularly of course to the time, so to speak, when he was in the zenith of his reformatory measures. For the past two or three years he has enjoyed comparative obscurity - an obscurity, however, more his own election than the result of the strenuous opposition he had to combat. There was a good deal of the Timon of Athens in his nature. The soubriquet "Little Bitters," applied to him, was the popular recognition of his strongly dominant trait. Embittered like Timon, and his confidence in political integrity shaken, if not wholly lost, he voluntarily exiled himself from political strife.

The life record of such a man as ex-Judge Whiting, so full of activity, extending through such a period of years and so intimately associated with many events of stirring character connected with the history of the city, is full of interest. To epitomize these events is only necessary, of course, of a man so widely known. Born in the city of Brooklyn on the 23rd of April, 1809, and having enjoyed fine educational advantages in his youth, he early selected the law as his profession. He applied himself with impassioned zeal to the legal studies. He was an apt student. All the branches of legal lore he embraced in his curriculum - the common law, and maritime and international law. His mind was naturally analytical and he sought to master the spirit as well as the letter of the law, to fathom its most intricate subtleties, to make mere precedents subsidiary to great underlying principles. He pursued his law studies in the office of George Wilson. He passed a brilliant examination - for in those days examinations for admission to the bar were far less the formality they are mainly nowadays - and entered upon the practice of his profession under auspices most brilliantly promising. His success at the bar fully sustained the highest expectations. An adept in the law, fluent of speech, a graceful speaker, a cogent reasoner, sharply acute in cross-examination, quick at repartee, sharp to detect the most assailable points on the opposite side and always keenly alert to the advantages of unexpected issues and contingencies presenting themselves in the progress of a case, he rapidly acquired an extended and lucrative practice. Such was his growing popularity that while yet a young man he was elected District Attorney for the city and county of New York. He help this position for many years, and in the discharge of his duties as city prosecutor added new laurels to his reputation as an eloquent and forcible advocate. While District Attorney he conducted some of the most interesting trials that have ever taken place in this city. Conspicuous among these was the trial of John C. Colt for the murder of Adams—the murder, as will be remembered, having been committed in a room occupied by Colt at the corner of Broadway and Chambers street, now Delmonico's. He convicted Colt, thought the latter cheated the gallows by suicide. He also conducted the prosecution of Monroe Edwards, the noted forger, securing his conviction and ridding the community of one of the most daring and successful forgers of the period. He was never so happy as when he convicted a prisoner, and it was to the fact of his conducting his prosecutions with such bitterness of spirit that he obtained the sobriquet of "Little Bitters," referred to above, and which clung to him through his long years of professional practice. Shortly after his retirement from the District Attorneyship his professional merits received a further tribute of public appreciation through his elevation to the Supreme Court Bench. This high post of judicial honor he did not long retain. His peculiar qualities of mind did not find here congenial development. It was too dry, tedious and formal, too slow work for one of his restless, impetuous activity of temperament. Besides - and that may have been a more potent consideration - our judges were poorly paid then, and he could make vastly more in practice of his profession. Resigning as Judge, he entered again with renewed ardor upon his legal practice. He continued to practice his profession up to recent illness, though for the most part of late years as advisory counsel and attorney, and seldom appearing in the trial of suits. Few lawyers in this city have enjoyed large or more lucrative practice. He was a representative lawyer of a class now rapidly passing away, and enjoyed the reputation in his day of being the foremost criminal lawyer at the New York Bar.

The political career of Judge Whiting can be briefly told. At one time he was elected Alderman of the Seventh ward - a portion of the city by the way in which he resided twenty years. That he gave satisfaction to his constituents is shown in the fact of his having been frequently solicited to accept a re-election, but which he as frequently declined. After resigning as Supreme Court Judge he became candidate for Mayor. He was pretty much his own candidate, however, and put forward as the exponent of ultra reform. He worked hard, giving many speeches, one of specially memorable character in the Old Bowery Theatre, of which he was the owner, and promising, if elected, to initiate many needed reforms in the administration of our municipal government. The public, it so happened, was not so ripe for reform as at the last election, and the result was that he polled but few votes. His purchase, in 1866, of the street cleaning contract awarded for ten years to Messrs. Brown, Devoe & Knapp, though hardly appropriately to be set down as forming a part of his political career, is certainly an episode in his later life that cannot well be passed over without mention. The dissatisfaction engendered by his manner of doing the work is well remembered. It was believed he would do the work as it ought to have been done and as required by the contract; but, as is well known a Legislative committee was appointed to investigate the case, and he subsequently resold the contract to the original owners. Though we in no respect would impugn the character of Judge Whiting for sterling integrity, it certainly would have been much better for his reputation had he never been mixed up with this street cleaning contract.

Judge Whiting was a man of large wealth. The fortune he leaves is estimated at $2,000,000. The foundation of this fortune he laid in his professional practice, though its large accumulation was greatly owing to judicious investments in real estate. He owned also the old Broadway Theatre and built the fine stores occupying its site. He leaves four children, who inherit the bulk of his property. Judge Whiting was a man of large liberality, and in private life the most genial and companionable of men.

References

1803 births
1872 deaths
New York County District Attorneys
New York Supreme Court Justices
Burials at Woodlawn Cemetery (Bronx, New York)
19th-century American judges